Lown may refer to:

 Lown (surname)
 Lown-e Kohneh, a Kurdistan Province
 Lown-e Sadat, a Kurdistan Province
 Lown-Berkovits, a cardiac defibrillator waveform
 Lown–Ganong–Levine syndrome, a pre-excitation syndrome of the heart
 The Lown Institute

See also
 Lun (disambiguation)
 Loon (disambiguation)